Ida Ovmar (born July 17, 1995) is a Swedish model and beauty pageant titleholder who won Miss Universe Sweden 2016 and represented Sweden at Miss Universe 2016. 

Ovmar started her pageant career at the age of seventeen when she entered the stage of Miss World Sweden. She won Miss Bride of Sweden and traveled to China. She placed in the top. The same year, 2014 she represented Sweden in Miss Supranational in Poland where she was in the top 20 and won the best body title.

During Miss Exclusive she was crowned as 1st runner-up. One year later she decided to compete for the first time in America, Miss Continents were held in Las Vegas June 2016. Ida Ovmar became the first woman outside the US to win the whole competition.

Personal life
Ovmar works as a model, and is ethnically Sami. She was born just outside Luleå but since a few years back lives in Stockholm.

In high school she studied society and behaviorism.

Pageantry

Miss Supranational 2014
On 5 December 2014 Ovmar represented Sweden at Miss Supranational 2014 in Poland.

Miss Continents 2016
She was the winner of Miss Continents 2016, she became the first contestant from outside the US to win the title.

Miss Universe Sweden 2016
On 28 August 2016 Ovmar was crowned Miss Universe Sweden 2016 at Café Opera in Stockholm. She represented Sweden at Miss Universe 2016 in Manila, Philippines.

Miss Universe 2016
Ovmar represented Sweden at Miss Universe 2016 but Unplaced.

Awards

References

External links
 

1995 births
Living people
Miss Universe 2016 contestants
Swedish beauty pageant winners
Swedish female models
Swedish Sámi people
People from Jokkmokk Municipality